Instant Piano was a humorous comics anthology published by Dark Horse Comics.  It ran for four issues from 1994 to 1995.

Awards and recognition
Writer Evan Dorkin received an Eisner Award for Best Short Story in 1996 for his story "The Eltingville Comic-Book, Science-Fiction, Fantasy, Horror, and Role-Playing Club in Bring Me the Head of Boba Fett" in issue #3 of the series.

Notes

References

Instant Piano at Comics DB

External links
Instant Piano at Comicvince

Comics anthologies